MITIM may refer to:

 Man in the Iron Mask, a name given to a prisoner arrested as Eustache Dauger in 1669, and held in a number of jails
 Master in International Technology & Innovation Management, a master's degree offered at:
 Graduate School of Management (St. Petersburg State University)
 Lappeenranta University of Technology